In March 2017, three attacks occurred in the city of Damascus, Syria. The first happened on the March 11, when a double bomb suicide attack in the Old City of Damascus on Saturday killed dozens of people - mostly Iraqi Shia pilgrims - and wounded more than 100. The second and the third happened on the March 15, when two suicide bombers detonated their explosive vests in the capital's main judicial building and in a restaurant.

Perpetrators
Tahrir al-Sham claimed responsibility for the first attack and the Islamic State of Iraq and the Levant claimed the second and the third.

See also
 List of bombings during the Syrian Civil War

References

Terrorist incidents in Damascus during the Syrian civil war
Islamic terrorist incidents in 2017
Islamic terrorism in Syria
Terrorist incidents in Syria in 2017
Mass murder in 2017
Mass murder in Syria
March 2017 events in Syria
March 2017 crimes in Asia
2017 murders in Syria